Gary Beach (October 10, 1947 – July 17, 2018) was an American actor of stage, film and television.  His roles included Roger De Bris in both the stage and film productions of The Producers, which won him a Tony Award, and Lumiere in the stage musical version of Disney's Beauty and the Beast, for which he was nominated for a Tony Award.

Early life
Beach was born in Alexandria, Virginia and graduated from Groveton High School. He went on to graduate from the North Carolina School of the Arts, the same school as his Beauty and the Beast co-star Terrence Mann.

Career
Beach's television credits included both the 2003 and 2009 Kennedy Center Honors, Queer as Folk, Murder, She Wrote, Cheers, Sisters, Arli$$, and Saved by the Bell, as well as "Recording the Producers", a documentary for PBS. Beach also lent his voice to Fox’s Family Guy in the now infamous banned-from-television episode "Partial Terms of Endearment" (available on DVD).

In 1994, Beach originated the comical role of Lumiere in Beauty and the Beast, a performance that earned him a Tony Award nomination for Best Featured Actor in a Musical. In 2001, he originated the stage role of Roger DeBris in The Producers for which he won the Tony Award for Featured Actor in a Musical. In 2004, he starred as Albin in the Broadway revival of La Cage aux Folles, earning him his third Tony nomination, this time for Leading Actor. After starring in the 2005 film version of The Producers, Beach returned to his stage role as Roger DeBris while the movie was in release, becoming the first artist to play the same part on Broadway and in movie theaters at the same time. In 2006, Beach played the role of Thénardier in the Broadway revival of Les Misérables, a role he had originated in the Los Angeles production. Previously, he performed in the chorus for the 1989 Les Misérables: Complete Symphonic Recording. In March 2008, Beach joined the United States national tour cast of Monty Python's Spamalot in the lead role of King Arthur.

Beach's other Broadway credits included Annie, Doonesbury, The Moony Shapiro Songbook, Broadway Bash, Sweet Adeline (Encores), Something's Afoot and 1776. He toured nationally with the James Kirkwood comedy Legends! starring Mary Martin and Carol Channing. In addition to his Broadway credits, Beach was well known for his Summer stock theatre performances. In later years he frequently returned to Sacramento as a Music Circus favorite in shows such as Guys and Dolls, A Funny Thing Happened On The Way To The Forum and Spamalot.

Personal life
Beach and his husband, Jeffrey Barnett, resided in Palm Springs, California  where Beach died on July 17, 2018 at the age of 70.

Awards and nominations

Stage productions
Les Misérables (revival) (2006–2008)
La Cage aux Folles (revival) (2004) 	
Funny Girl (benefit concert) (2002)
The Producers (2001)
Beauty and the Beast (1994)
Doonesbury: A Musical Comedy (1983)
The Moony Shapiro Songbook (1981)
Annie (1977–1983)
Something's Afoot (1976)
1776 (1969–1972)

National tours
Annie
Beauty and the Beast
Les Misérables
Legends (with Mary Martin and Carol Channing)
Spamalot

References

External links
 
 
 
Gary Beach - Downstage Center 2005 interview at American Theatre Wing.org

1947 births
2018 deaths
American male singers
American male musical theatre actors
American male television actors
Drama Desk Award winners
American gay actors
American gay musicians
People from Fire Island, New York
Tony Award winners
LGBT people from Virginia
University of North Carolina School of the Arts alumni
20th-century American LGBT people
21st-century American LGBT people